Qeshlaq-e Ilkhchi-ye Sofla (also Romanized as Qeshlāq-e Īlkhchī-ye Soflá; also known as Īlkhchīh-ye Pā’īn and Qeshlāq-e Īlchī-ye Soflá) is a village in Azadlu Rural District, Muran District, Germi County, Ardabil Province, Iran. At the 2006 census, its population was 60, in 10 families.

References 

Towns and villages in Germi County